Janaka Biyanwila (born 4 May 1965) is a Sri Lankan diver. He competed in the men's 3 metre springboard event at the 1996 Summer Olympics.

References

External links
 

1965 births
Living people
Sri Lankan male divers
Olympic divers of Sri Lanka
Divers at the 1996 Summer Olympics
Sportspeople from Colombo